BigMarker is browser based online platform for learning and sharing through web conferences and webinars. It is an online meeting, webinar, desktop sharing, video and web conferencing software that allows online presenters to meet with other computer users, customers, clients, educators, organizations and businesses via the Internet. BigMarker allows users to record, store and download webinars and web conferences. It also provides a free public directory listing of webinars and web conferences available to watch or attend. BigMarker’s method of software delivery is commonly referred to as Software as a Service.

History 
BigMarker was developed in 2010 by Zhu-Song Mei, formerly of Accenture in Chicago, Illinois. It was born from the idea that web conferencing could help people anywhere learn and build relationships with peers and experts. Since then, BigMarker has evolved into a full-featured web conferencing service, live stream event platform, and online community with attendees from 190 countries.

Technology 
The original BigMarker platform operated on Adobe Flash Player in all modern browsers including the latest versions of Internet Explorer, Mozilla Firefox, Google Chrome or Safari (Mac). The newest version of BigMarker was released in July 2014, and is a web application platform operated on WebRTC technology. BigMarker is designed to connect people and groups on the internet via a person’s computer, webcam, microphone and speakers.

Features 
9-way video conferencing, allows users to hold conversations, meetings, presentations and seminars between two or more users, screen sharing, application sharing, recording, public profiles, public and private webinars, audio via computer microphone and speakers, YouTube video sharing, the ability to charge attendees, and community features to engage and build an audience between gatherings. BigMarker offers both a free and paid subscription model.

References

External links
 BigMarker website

Communication software
Web conferencing